Colo Heights is a village of Sydney, in the state of New South Wales, Australia. It is located in the City of Hawkesbury north-west of Colo.

References

Suburbs of Sydney
City of Hawkesbury